

Films

References

Films
2012
2012-related lists